Nicholas John Sirianni (born June 15, 1981) is an American football coach who is the head coach for the Philadelphia Eagles of the National Football League (NFL). He previously served as the offensive coordinator for the Indianapolis Colts from 2018 to 2020 and also served as an assistant coach for the San Diego/Los Angeles Chargers and Kansas City Chiefs.

Early life
Sirianni is the son of Fran and Amy Sirianni. His father was the head coach at Southwestern Central High School in West Ellicott, New York, where Nick graduated in 1999.

Sirianni played wide receiver at Division III Mount Union in Alliance, Ohio, winning national championships in 2000, 2001, and 2002. Though a calf injury and compartment syndrome nearly ended his playing career as a sophomore, Sirianni started for three years. As a senior in 2003, he had 998 yards and 13 touchdowns and graduated with a degree in education.

He played one season for the Canton Legends of the American Indoor Football League.

Coaching career

College coaching
Sirianni began coaching as the defensive backs coach at his alma mater, Mount Union. After one season of coaching Mount Union, he was hired by the Indiana University of Pennsylvania, where he coached receivers for three seasons.

Kansas City Chiefs
His leap to the NFL came in 2009 after getting an interview through a friend with new Chiefs head coach Todd Haley. Sirianni had gotten to know Haley from attending the same YMCA when Sirianni was in college and Haley was a wide receivers coach with the Chicago Bears. Haley hired Sirianni as the offensive quality control coach. Sirianni was retained under new coach Romeo Crennel and was promoted to wide receivers coach in Crennel's only season as the Chiefs head coach. Sirianni was not retained under new head coach Andy Reid.

San Diego Chargers
In 2014 he became the team's quarterbacks coach, working with quarterback Philip Rivers and offensive coordinator Frank Reich. In 2016, Sirianni became the wide receivers coach.

Indianapolis Colts
After Reich became the head coach of the Indianapolis Colts in 2018, he hired Sirianni as offensive coordinator. Sirianni developed a close relationship with Reich though, unlike some head coaches, Reich chose to call the team's plays rather than delegate the responsibility to Sirianni. During his three years as offensive coordinator with the Colts, Sirianni had a different starting quarterback each year, working with Andrew Luck, Jacoby Brissett, and Philip Rivers. The Colts made the playoffs twice and finished 10th, 19th, and 12th in offensive DVOA, a measure of offensive success.

Philadelphia Eagles
On January 24, 2021, Sirianni was hired to become the head coach of the Philadelphia Eagles after the firing of Doug Pederson. Two months later, the Eagles traded quarterback Carson Wentz to the Colts, leaving former second-round pick Jalen Hurts as the presumed starter. Sirianni put together a staff of young coaches, including defensive coordinator Jonathan Gannon and offensive coordinator Shane Steichen, both of whom had previously worked with Sirianni. Although much of Pederson's staff was replaced, Sirianni retained veteran offensive line coach Jeff Stoutland.

On September 12, 2021, Sirianni made his regular-season head coaching debut against the Atlanta Falcons and led the Eagles to a 32–6 win. Despite a 2-5 start, Sirianni concluded his first season as head coach with a 9-8 record and a wild card berth. The Eagles lost in the Wild Card Round of the playoffs to the Tampa Bay Buccaneers 31–15, who themselves would lose the following week. Sirianni was the only first-year coach to lead a team to the playoffs in the 2021 NFL season, and the third Eagles head coach to make the playoffs in their first year as head coach, joining Chip Kelly in 2013 and Ray Rhodes in 1995.

The 2022 Eagles compiled a 14–3 record in the regular season, earning the NFC East division championship and a first-round bye in the playoffs. The Eagles became the first team since the 1989 Minnesota Vikings to record at least 70 sacks, led the league in fewest passing yards allowed, and set a franchise record for wins and points scored in a season. In the playoffs, Sirianni led the Eagles to their fourth Super Bowl in franchise history after a 38–7 Divisional Round playoff victory against the New York Giants, and a 31–7 NFC Championship win against the San Francisco 49ers. The Eagles lost to the Kansas City Chiefs in Super Bowl LVII 38–35.

Head coaching record

Coaching tree
Two of Sirianni's coaching assistants have become head coaches in the NFL:
Jonathan Gannon, Arizona Cardinals (2023–present)
Shane Steichen, Indianapolis Colts (2023–present)

Personal life
He is married to Brett Ashley Sirianni with whom he has three children; the two met when Nick was working for the Kansas City Chiefs. His father, Fran, and his brother Jay are both former head coaches of Southwestern Central High School, and his brother Mike Sirianni is the head coach at Washington & Jefferson College in Washington, Pennsylvania.

Sirianni is a Christian. He has said, “… Faith is No. 1 for a reason. I’m very grateful to God for everything that I have.”

During an interview with Rich Eisen, Sirianni stated that he grew up a fan of the Pittsburgh Steelers.

References

External links
Philadelphia Eagles bio

1981 births
Living people
American people of Italian descent
Sportspeople from Jamestown, New York
Kansas City Chiefs coaches
Philadelphia Eagles head coaches
San Diego Chargers coaches
Los Angeles Chargers coaches
IUP Crimson Hawks football coaches
Mount Union Purple Raiders football coaches
Mount Union Purple Raiders football players
Indianapolis Colts coaches
Southwestern Central High School alumni
Philadelphia Eagles coaches
National Football League offensive coordinators